Moriodema mcoyei is a species of beetle in the family Carabidae, the only species in the genus Moriodema.

References

Psydrinae
Monotypic Carabidae genera
Taxa named by François-Louis Laporte, comte de Castelnau